Timothy David Beckman (born January 19, 1965) is a former American football coach.  He served as the head football coach at the University of Toledo from 2009 to 2011 and at the University of Illinois at Urbana–Champaign from 2012 to 2014, compiling a career college football coaching record of 33–41.  Beckman was terminated by Illinois on August 28, 2015, seven days prior to the Illini's scheduled season opener, after numerous allegations of abuse of players surfaced.

Early life
Beckman attended high school at Forest Park High School in Beaumont, Texas, for two years before completing his secondary education at Berea High School in Berea, Ohio.

Beckman is the son of David Beckman, a longtime NCAA, NFL, and CFL coach and scout.

He attended the University of Findlay, where he lettered on the football team for two years; in both years the Oilers qualified for the NAIA Football National Championship playoffs.  He graduated from Findlay in 1985 with a degree in physical education.

Coaching career

Assistant coach
Beckman began his coaching career at Auburn as a graduate assistant under Pat Dye from 1988 to 1989. Auburn were SEC co-champions in those seasons, and Beckman earned a master's degree in education from Auburn. From 1990 to 1995, Beckman was secondary coach and recruiting coordinator at Western Carolina. He later became defensive coordinator and recruiting coordinator at Elon, a position he would hold from 1996 to 1997.

Beckman coached at Bowling Green as defensive coordinator and associate head coach from 1998 to 2004 and at Ohio State under Jim Tressel as cornerbacks coach from 2005 to 2006, where he was a three-time nominee for the Frank Broyles Award.

Beckman was the defensive coordinator at Oklahoma State University from 2007 to 2008. The Cowboys posted a record of 16–10 during those seasons.

Toledo
On December 4, 2008, Beckman was hired as the head coach at Toledo, to replace Tom Amstutz, who resigned during the 2008 season. Beckman's teams at Toledo saw consistent improvement. The 2008 team he inherited went 3–9. In 2009, his first year as a head coach, his team improved to finish 5–7. In the following year, his team finished 8–5, 7–1 in the MAC, earning a berth to the 2010 Little Caesar's Pizza Bowl, which they lost 34–32 to the FIU Golden Panthers. In his final year at Toledo, Coach Beckman finished 9–4, 7–1 in the MAC to be West Division co-champions with Northern Illinois. This team earned a berth to the 2011 Military Bowl. However, Beckman left after the regular season to become the head coach for Illinois.

Illinois
At Illinois, Beckman went 12–25 in three seasons, and only won four games in Big Ten play.  In his third season, the Illini managed to qualify for a bowl with a 6–6 record, but lost 35–18 to Louisiana Tech in the Heart of Dallas Bowl.

On August 28, 2015—just a week before what was to be his fourth season—Beckman was fired after the preliminary results of an internal investigation substantiated accusations of gross player mistreatment.  Most seriously, the investigation found that he'd forced players to play through serious injuries and had the medical staff clear these players too soon.

In a statement, Beckman called his ouster a "rush to judgment" that violated the terms of his contract, and stated that he intended to "vigorously defend both my reputation and my legal rights."

On April 11, 2016, Beckman settled with the university for a one time payment of $250,000 with the decision of firing "for cause" due to the mistreatment of players standing.

North Carolina
On August 24, 2016; Beckman was hired to serve as a volunteer assistant defensive coach for the North Carolina Tar Heels, working under head coach Larry Fedora. Beckman and Fedora have a working history together, having both served as assistant coaches on Mike Gundy's staff at Oklahoma State in 2007.  However, after a firestorm of criticism, Beckman resigned from this position the next day, claiming he did not want to be a "distraction."  It was later revealed that UNC chancellor Carol Folt had strongly objected to Beckman's presence, even in a volunteer role, once she learned about the arrangement.

Controversies

Toledo
In 2013, a former Toledo football player, Kyle Cameron, sued Beckman, the University of Toledo, and five members of Beckman's staff at Toledo for negligence and for violating Ohio's anti-hazing law. Cameron's lawsuit and appeal were dismissed as the suit was filed through the incorrect division of the Lucas County Court. However, Cameron's legal counsel has asked the Supreme Court of Ohio to review the case.

Illinois
Beckman was hired on December 9, 2011, by Illinois athletic director Mike Thomas.
Prior to the start of the 2012 season, Beckman sent six Illinois assistant coaches to State College, Pennsylvania to recruit Penn State football players who the NCAA deemed eligible to transfer without missing playing time due to the Penn State child sex abuse scandal. In October 2012 season, Illinois self-reported secondary violations to the NCAA as television cameras caught Beckman using chewing tobacco on the sidelines during a football game at Wisconsin.

Head coaching record

See also
 List of Auburn University people

Notes

References

External links
 Illinois profile
 Oklahoma State profile
 Ohio State profile
 Bowling Green profile

1965 births
Living people
Auburn Tigers football coaches
Auburn University alumni
Bowling Green Falcons football coaches
Elon Phoenix football coaches
Findlay Oilers football players
Illinois Fighting Illini football coaches
Ohio State Buckeyes football coaches
Oklahoma State Cowboys football coaches
Toledo Rockets football coaches
Western Carolina Catamounts football coaches
Sportspeople from Beaumont, Texas
People from Berea, Ohio
Players of American football from Ohio
Sportspeople from Cuyahoga County, Ohio
College football controversies